Cheshunt Park is a 40 hectare public park and Local Nature Reserve in Cheshunt in Hertfordshire. It is owned and managed by Broxbourne Borough Council.

The history of the park goes back to Roman times and was crossed by Ermine Street. It was originally the park of Cheshunt Great House. It is grass and woodland which has ancient hedgerows, wildflower meadows, a pond and an orchard which is cropped by traditional cattle breeds. It has car parking, a playground, toilets and a café.

There is access from Park Lane.

Notes

References

External links

Local Nature Reserves in Hertfordshire
Cheshunt